Yusufiyah is an abandoned village in Qatar located in the municipality of Al Shamal. It was previously one of the most important towns on Qatar's north coast. An old stone fort, Qalaat Yusufiyeh, is found here.

Nearby settlements include Al Jumail to the south and Abu Dhalouf to the immediate east.

Etymology
The village's name is credited to the Yusifiyeh tribe who, in the past, resided here.

History
In the 1820s, George Barnes Brucks was tasked with preparing the first British survey of the Persian Gulf. He wrote down the following notes about Yusufiyah, referring to it as Yossfee:

References

Al Shamal